Like Red on a Rose is the fourteenth studio album by American country music artist Alan Jackson. It was released on September 26, 2006. The album produced two singles, the title track and "A Woman's Love", which respectively reached numbers 15 and 5 on the Hot Country Songs charts.

This album was produced by singer Alison Krauss, who also selected the songs. "A Woman's Love", a re-recording of a song previously included on Jackson's 1998 High Mileage album, was the only song written by Jackson. This album abandoned Jackson's typical neotraditional country style and his usual producer Keith Stegall, and instead went for a soft rock/adult contemporary sound.

Track listing

Personnel
Adapted from the album's liner notes.

Musicians
Ron Block – acoustic guitar, twin electric guitars on "A Woman's Love"
Jim Cox – Fender Rhodes, Hammond B-3 organ, Wurlitzer
Jerry Douglas – lap steel guitar, Dobro
Alan Jackson – lead vocals
Alison Krauss – strings
Viktor Krauss – bass guitar, upright bass
Howard Levy – harmonica
Michael McDonald – clavinet, Fender Rhodes
Joey Miskulin – accordion
Gordon Mote – piano, Fender Rhodes, Hammond B-3 organ
The Nashville String Machine – strings on "A Woman's Love" and "Had It Not Been You"
Bernard Purdie – drums
Kenny Vaughan – electric guitar

Backing vocalists
Sam Bush
Sidney Cox
Suzanne Cox
Dave Denman
Alison Krauss
Richard Sterban
Dan Tyminski
Cheryl White
Lee Ann Womack

Technical
Carl Gorodetzky – string contractor
Alison Krauss – producer
Michael Omartian – string arranger and conductor
Gary Paczosa – Recording Engineer, Mix Engineer
Brandon Bell – Recording Engineer
Joey Crawford – Assistant Recording Engineer
Greg Lawrence – Assistant Recording Engineer
Terry Christian – Recording Engineer (for String Session)
Doug Sax – Mastering Engineer
Sangwook Nam – Mastering Engineer

Chart performance
Like Red on a Rose debuted at No. 4 on the U.S. Billboard 200, and No. 1 on the Top Country Albums selling 86,000 copies, becoming his ninth No. 1 country album. The album was certified Gold by the RIAA in January 2007.

Weekly charts

Year-end charts

Sales and certifications

References

External links
 

2006 albums
Alan Jackson albums
Arista Records albums
Albums produced by Alison Krauss